Sharon Carson (born November 11, 1957) is an American politician who has served in the New Hampshire Senate from the 14th district since 2008. She previously served in the New Hampshire House of Representatives from Rockingham's 3rd district from 2000 to 2008.

She also serves as a professor at Nashua Community College for American Government and Politics.

References

External links

Sharon Carson at Ballotpedia

|-

|-

1957 births
21st-century American politicians
21st-century American women politicians
Living people
Republican Party members of the New Hampshire House of Representatives
Republican Party New Hampshire state senators
People from Limestone, Maine
People from Londonderry, New Hampshire
University of New Hampshire alumni
Women state legislators in New Hampshire